Vorpahl (from  "before", "in front of" plus Pfahl "pole", "pale") is a Low German dwelling/habitational surname for a person who lived at a boundary marker (Grenzpfahl: "boundary post"). Notable people with the name include:
 Chris Vorpahl (born 1990), retired Chilean female volleyball player
  (1905–1944), German communist resistance fighter against Nazism
 Mildred Vorpahl Baass (1917–2012), American poet
 Nicole Vorpahl (born 1994), Chilean volleyball player

See also 
 
 Vorpal (disambiguation)

References 

German-language surnames